Tiffany Zulkosky (born May 19, 1984) is an American politician. She has served in the Alaska House of Representatives from District 38 since March 2018. Zulkosky is a Democrat and caucuses with the House Majority Caucus. In 2018, she was appointed by Governor Bill Walker and unanimously approved by House Democrats to fill the vacant seat in District 38. Zulkosky, who is Yup'ik, is the only Alaska Native woman currently serving in the Alaska Legislature.

Education 
Zulkosky graduated from Bethel Regional High School in 2002. She earned a B.A. in Organizational Communications from Northwest University in 2006 and a Master's in Public Administration from the University of Alaska Southeast in 2015.

Career

Mayor of Bethel
Zulkosky was elected Mayor of Bethel at 24 and holds the distinction of being the youngest Mayor in Bethel's history. She resigned from the position in April 2009 to work as U.S. Senator Mark Begich's Rural Director.

Other work
Zulkosky served as U.S. Senator Mark Begich's Rural Director from 2009 - 2011. She then became the Alaska West Area Director at USDA until 2013. After, she was the Executive Director of Nuvista Light and Electric Cooperative until 2016, at which point she became the Vice-President of Communications at the Yukon Kuskokwim Health Corporation. Zulkosky is on a "Leave of Absence" from YKHC while the Legislature is in session.

Alaska House of Representatives 
After the resignation of Zach Fansler due to allegations of assault in February 2018, Zulkosky was appointed by Bill Walker, making her the first Yup'ik woman to be a member of the Alaska Legislature.

Alaska Native tribes 
Zulkosky has sought to establish better relationships between the Government of Alaska and indigenous tribes native to Alaska. She has focused on "tribal compacting", which outlines which services will be provided by tribal authorities and which will be provided by the government.

References 

1984 births
Yupik people
Democratic Party members of the Alaska House of Representatives
Native American state legislators in Alaska
University of Alaska Southeast alumni
Women state legislators in Alaska
Living people
Women mayors of places in Alaska
People from Bethel, Alaska
21st-century American politicians
21st-century American women politicians
Native American women in politics
21st-century Native American women
21st-century Native Americans